Scott Frantz may refer to:

Scott Frantz (politician) (born 1960), American politician
Scott Frantz (American football) (born 1996), American football offensive tackle